Changzhi Wangcun Airport  is an airport serving Changzhi, Shanxi, China.

Airlines and destinations

See also
List of airports in China

References

Airports in Shanxi
Changzhi